Jordan Township is the name of some places in the U.S. state of Pennsylvania:

Jordan Township, Clearfield County, Pennsylvania
Jordan Township, Lycoming County, Pennsylvania
Jordan Township, Northumberland County, Pennsylvania

Pennsylvania township disambiguation pages